Gannett is a surname. Notable people with the surname include:

Abbie M. Gannett (1845–1895), American essayist, poet and philanthropist
Alice P. Gannett (1875-1962), American settlement house worker and social reformer
Barzillai Gannett (1764–1832), American politician
Diana Gannett, American classical double bassist and educator
Ezra Stiles Gannett (1801–1871), American unitarian minister
Frank Gannett (1876–1957), American publisher, founder of Gannett Company
Henry Gannett (1846–1914), American geographer
Lewis Gannett, American writer
Robert T. Gannett (1917–2012), American politician